is a Japanese mecha anime artist and science fiction illustrator.

Personal life
Hidetaka Tenjin was born in Nishinomiya, Kobe City, on October 13, 1973. After graduating from the Shibaura institute of Technology's Department of System Engineering, majoring in mechanical control systems, he became a freelance illustrator.

Mechanical and Sci-fi Illustrations
Later he established the Tenjin Studio Ltd. where he began working on plastic model box art, video game software and DVD cover art, illustrations, etc., the best known being in the Hasegawa Macross series, the Bandai MG Gundam series, Konami's Gradius V videogame, Space Battleship Yamato Fact File illustrations, etc. He has declared in many occasions that his realistic art style is influenced by the works of Yoshiyuki Takani, Noriyoshi Ohrai, Shigeru Komatsuzaki, Yuji Kaida and Tsuyoshi Nagano.

Anime
Tenjin Hidetaka has also worked as an animation artist in several sci-fi anime productions like Macross Zero, Sousei no Aquarion, Gundam Evolve, Macross Frontier and Macross Delta.

Videography

Macross
Macross Zero - Mechanical Artist
Macross Frontier - Mechanical Artist
Macross Frontier: The False Diva - Mechanical Artist
Macross Frontier: The Wings of Goodbye - Mechanical Artist
Macross Delta - Macross Visual Artist

Other anime
Hellsing Ultimate - Mechanical Artist, Special Effects
Genesis of Aquarion - Mechanical Artist, Special Effects
Aquarion Evol - Mechanical Artist
Noein - to your other self - Special Effects
BALDR FORCE EXE Resolution - Texture Artist, Special Effects
FREEDOM-PROJECT - Background Artist, Special Effects
Engage Planet Kiss Dum - Mechanical Artist, Special Effects
Glass Fleet - Texture Artist
Gundam Evolve - Mechanical Artist, Special Effects

Video games
Sonic Wings Assault - Videogame Box Art
Macross VF-X2 - Videogame Box Art
Macross Plus GAME EDITION 
Gradius V - Videogame Box Art
Armodyne - Videogame Box Art
STARHAWK - Videogame Box Art Japan Release
Macross Ultimate Frontier - Videogame Box Art
Macross Ace Frontier - Videogame Box Art
Macross Triangle Frontier - Title Art
Macross 30: The Voice that Connects the Galaxy - Videogame Box Art
Mobile Suit Gundam Side Stories - Videogame Box Art
Mobile Suit Gundam: Battle Operation

Artbooks
Tenjin Hidetaka Art Works Of Macross: VALKYRIES - Mechanical Illustrator
Hidetaka Tenjin Works: the Art of Hidetaka Tenjin - Mechanical Illustrator
Tenjin Hidetaka Art Works Of Macross: VALKYRIES SECOND SORTIE - Mechanical Illustrator
Macross The Ride - Mechanical Illustrator
Yamato Mechanical Illustrations - Mechanical Illustrator
Tenjin Hidetaka Art Works Of Macross: VALKYRIES THIRD SORTIE - Mechanical Illustrator

References

External links
Tenjin Studio Official site

1973 births

Living people
Japanese artists
Inkpot Award winners